Happy Journey is a 2014 Indian Marathi drama film directed by Sachin Kundalkar and produced by Sanjay Chhabria under the banner of Everest Entertainment. It features Atul Kulkarni and Priya Bapat in the lead roles.
 It was remade in Malayalam in 2018 as Koode, with Prithviraj Sukumaran, Nazriya Nazim and Parvathy Thiruvothu in lead roles. Art Director Ajay Sharma won the Best Art Director Award, Maharashtra State Film Awards (2015) for Happy Journey and worked in movies such as Liar’s Dice (2013), Welcome 2 Karachi (2015), Fever (2016) and Bob Biswas (2021).

Plot 

The story is about the love of brother and sister. A sister who hardly has seen her brother in her life. So after her death her ghost shares her experiences and helps her brother and finally disappears.

Cast 
 Atul Kulkarni as Niranjan
 Pallavi Subhash as Alice
 Priya Bapat as Janaki
 Chitra Palekar as Ansuya (Alice's mother)
 Madhav Abhyankar as Niranjan & Janaki's father
 Shiv Kumar Subramaniam as  Andrew (Alice's father)
 Siddharth Menon as Ajinkya
 Suhita Thatte as Janaki's mother

Music 

The soundtrack of the film has been given by Karan Kulkarni and lyrics have been penned by Omkar Kulkarni, Kshitij Patwardhan and Tejas Modak. The first single "Fresh", sung by Shalmali Kholgade released on 8 July 2014.

Adaptation
It was officially adapted into Malayalam as Koode, directed by Anjali Menon and starring Prithviraj Sukumaran, Nazriya Nazim, and Parvathy. It was also remade in Telugu as #BRO starring Naveen Chandra which got released on Sony Liv.

References

External links 
 
 
 

2014 films
Indian drama films
2010s Marathi-language films
Marathi films remade in other languages
Films directed by Sachin Kundalkar